Arena is a 2013 Russian film, directed by Eduard Bordukov and produced by Khayrulin Ramil. It had its world premiere at the 66th Cannes Film Festival as part of the non-competitive program ShortFilmCorner. One of the main roles in the film played a famous young actor Azamat Nigmanov (Best Actor at the 23rd Kinotavr for the film Convoy by Aleksei Mizgiryov).

Synopsis 
This is Moscow. There is a cruel labyrinth of courtyard which is impossible to escape. There are three of them: an Uzbek guy and two policemen. They are victims. Their fate is decided. Nobody will help them - people are thirsting for bread and circuses.

Cast 
 Azamat Nigmanov as Erbalat
 Vlad Dunaev as Kolia
 Vadim Dorofeev as Semion
 Ilya Zhinilo as leader of the skinhead

Accolades
 2013 Special Prize "Granat" from partners "KONIK Film Festival" GBUK "Moscow Cinema" on "KONIK" Film-Festival in Moscow, Russia
 2013 Member of -competition program "Curiosities" 1st International Short Film Festival "SHORT" in Kaliningrad, Russia
 2013 Member of the "NO ANESTHESIA" 9th International short and animation film festival OPEN CINEMA in Saint Petersburg, Russia
 2013 Member of the "Short and Sweet" VII International Film Festival Andrei Tarkovsky's "The Mirror" in Ivanovo, Russia
 2013 66th Cannes Film Festival, program Short Film Corner, France
 2013 Member of the festival competition program 8th Monaco Charity Film Festival, Monaco
 2013 Diploma at the 36th Film Festival Grenzland-Filmtage in Germany
 2013 Member of the competition program of the 14th KAN Film Festival in Poland
 2013 Member of the competitive program 5th Ljubljana International Short Film Festival in Slovenia
 2013 Member of the competitive program VII Moscow Short Film Festival "Debut film", Moscow, Russia

References

External links 
 В Каннах покажут российскую короткометражку
 Россия попала в Канны
 Российский короткий метр на европейских кинофестивалях
 Фильмы молодых режиссеров вошли в программу Каннского фестиваля
 Российский короткий метр в Каннах
 Российский короткий метр в Каннах
 Российскую короткометражку покажут в Каннах
 Фильмы молодых режиссеров вошли в программу Каннского фестиваля
 Российские короткометражки покажут в каннском Short Film Corner
 Фильмы молодых режиссеров вошли в программу Каннского фестиваля
 Открывается 66-й Каннский фестиваль
 В 66 Каннском кинофестивале примут участие 17 российских короткометражных фильмов, поставленных молодыми режиссёрами
 Фильмы молодых режиссеров вошли в программу Каннского фестиваля

2013 films
Russian short films
2013 short films
2010s Russian-language films